This article lists candidates for the 2016 Australian federal election. There were 1,625 candidates in total (994 for the House of Representatives and 631 for the Senate).

Retiring members

Labor
Anna Burke MP (Chisholm, Vic) – announced retirement 16 December 2015
  Laurie Ferguson MP (Werriwa, NSW) – announced retirement 12 August 2014
 Gary Gray MP (Brand, WA) – announced retirement 16 February 2016
 Alan Griffin MP (Bruce, Vic) – announced retirement 10 February 2015
 Jill Hall MP (Shortland, NSW) announced retirement 28 February 2016
 Alannah MacTiernan MP (Perth, WA) – announced retirement 12 February 2016
 Melissa Parke MP (Fremantle, WA) – announced retirement 22 January 2016
 Bernie Ripoll MP (Oxley, Qld) – announced retirement 14 April 2015
 Kelvin Thomson MP (Wills, Vic) – announced retirement 10 November 2015
 Senator Joe Ludwig (Qld) – announced retirement 9 March 2015
 Senator Jan McLucas (Qld) – announced retirement 5 April 2015
 Senator Nova Peris (NT) – announced retirement 24 May 2016

Liberal
 Bob Baldwin MP (Paterson, NSW) – announced retirement 16 April 2016
 Bruce Billson MP (Dunkley, Vic) – announced retirement 24 November 2015
 Bronwyn Bishop MP (Mackellar, NSW) – lost preselection 16 April 2016, delivered valedictory speech 4 May 2016
 Andrew Robb MP (Goldstein, Vic) – announced retirement 10 February 2016
 Philip Ruddock MP (Berowra, NSW) – announced retirement 8 February 2016
 Andrew Southcott MP (Boothby, SA) – announced retirement 4 September 2015
 Sharman Stone MP (Murray, Vic) – announced retirement 26 March 2016
 Senator Bill Heffernan (NSW) – announced retirement 19 February 2016

National
John Cobb MP (Calare, NSW) – announced retirement 27 February 2016

Liberal National
 Mal Brough MP (Fisher, Qld) – announced retirement 26 February 2016
 Teresa Gambaro MP (Brisbane, Qld) – announced retirement 9 March 2016
 Ian Macfarlane MP (Groom, Qld) – announced retirement 15 February 2016
 Bruce Scott MP (Maranoa, Qld) – announced retirement 3 August 2015
 Warren Truss MP (Wide Bay, Qld) – announced retirement 11 February 2016

Palmer United
 Clive Palmer MP (Fairfax, Qld) – announced retirement 4 May 2016, ruled out Senate candidacy 23 May 2016

House of Representatives
Sitting members are listed in bold text. Successful candidates are highlighted in the relevant colour. Where there is possible confusion, an asterisk (*) is also used.

Australian Capital Territory

New South Wales

Northern Territory

Queensland

South Australia

Tasmania

Victoria

Western Australia

Senate
Sitting senators are listed in bold. Since this was a double dissolution election, each state elected twelve senators. Typically, the first six successful candidates from each state are elected to six-year terms, the remaining six to three-year terms, although this can create distorted results in the single transferable vote system. Section 282 of the Commonwealth Electoral Act provides for a fairer method of allocation, involving a re-count of the Senate votes cast as if the election had been a half-Senate election for six seats. The long term seats are allocated to those elected in the re-count, and the short-term positions allocated to the remaining elected candidates.

Ultimately, the power to determine terms is given under the Constitution to the Senate. Following the 1987 double dissolution, the Senate chose to ignore the alternative count and instead use the traditional method based on order of election.

Tickets that elected at least one Senator are highlighted in the relevant colour. Successful candidates are identified by an asterisk (*).

Australian Capital Territory
Two seats were up for election. The Labor Party was defending one seat. The Liberal Party was defending one seat.

New South Wales
Twelve seats were up for election. The Labor Party was defending four seats. The Liberal/National Coalition was defending six seats. The Australian Greens were defending one seat. The Liberal Democratic Party was defending one seat.

Northern Territory
Two seats were up for election. The Labor Party was defending one seat. The Country Liberal Party was defending one seat.

Queensland
Twelve seats were up for election. The Labor Party was defending four seats. The Liberal National Party was defending six seats. The Australian Greens were defending one seat. The Palmer United Party was defending one seat, although Senator Glenn Lazarus had left the party and was contesting for his Glenn Lazarus Team.

South Australia
Twelve seats were up for election. The Labor Party was defending three seats. The Liberal Party was defending five seats. The Australian Greens were defending two seats. The Family First Party was defending one seat. The Nick Xenophon Team was defending one seat.

Tasmania
Twelve seats were up for election. The Labor Party was defending five seats. The Liberal Party was defending four seats. The Australian Greens were defending two seats. The Palmer United Party was defending one seat, although Senator Jacqui Lambie had left the party and contested for her Jacqui Lambie Network.

Victoria
The Labor Party was defending four seats. The Liberal/National Coalition was defending four seats. The Australian Greens were defending two seats. The Motoring Enthusiast Party was defending one seat. The Democratic Labour Party was defending one seat, although Senator John Madigan had left the party and was running for his own Manufacturing and Farming Party.

Western Australia
Twelve seats were up for election. The Labor Party was defending three seats. The Liberal Party was defending six seats. The Australian Greens were defending two seats. The Palmer United Party was defending one seat.

Summary by party 
Beside each party is the number of seats contested by that party in the House of Representatives for each state, as well as an indication of whether the party contested the Senate election in the respective state.

Notes

References

2016 federal election candidates: Antony Green ABC

External links

List of Senate How-To-Vote Card Preferences
Labor
NSW Labor
Victorian Labor candidates
Qld Labor
WA Labor
SA Labor
Tasmanian Labor
ACT Labor candidates
NT Labor
Liberal candidates
The Nationals
Liberal Democrats
Greens
NSW Greens candidates
Victorian Greens candidates
Qld Greens candidates
Greens WA
SA Greens candidates
Tasmanian Greens candidates
ACT Greens candidates
NT Greens
2016 NXT candidate list
21st Century Australia Party candidates
 Australian Liberty Alliance (ALA) candidates
 Socialist Alliance (SA) candidates
 Socialist Equality Party (SEP) candidates
 Australian Progressives
 Science Party

Candidates
Candidates for Australian federal elections